Mugabo is a surname. Notable people with the surname include:

Alfred Mugabo (born 1995), Rwandan footballer
Carlos Mugabo (born 1987), American basketball player
Sonia Mugabo, Rwandan businesswoman and fashion designer
Stella Ford Mugabo (born 1962), Rwandan politician

See also
Mugabe (disambiguation)